European Club Championship may refer to one of several competitions:

 EHF Men's Champions Trophy, known as  the Men's European Club Championship until 2007
 EHF Women's Champions Trophy, known as  the Women's European Club Championship until 2007
 Futsal European Clubs Championship a futsal competition that ran from 1984 until the creation of the UEFA Futsal Cup in 2001
 European Club Championships, a chess competition